Olivier Frapolli (born 27 September 1971) is a French professional football manager and former player, who currently manages Laval.

Club career
As a youth, he often played against Zinedine Zidane in regional tournaments, before playing together representing the Mediterranean leagues. He joined the Toulouse's youth academy in 1987, who were noted for their strong youth development. He roomed with Fabien Barthez at their training centre. He was promoted to Toulouse's senior team in 1992, and made 50 appearances in the Ligue 1.

In the 1993–94 season, Toulouse was relegated and Frapolli was not in his coaches plans. He agreed to join Perpignan on loan in the Ligue 2 in 1994, and then to Stade Poitevin the following season. He moved to Beauvais Oise from 1996 to 1999, and then to Martigues for a couple of seasons. He joined Créteil on 6 June 2001, and ended his career with them in 2004.

International career
Frapolli was a youth international for France, having represented the France U21 in 1993.

Managerial career
On 20 April 2003, Frapolli started the process of earning his coaching badges in France. In the tail-end of his career, he was demoted to the reserves of Créteil, and became their captain and then player-manager in December 2003. He helped Créteil II win the 2005-2006 Championnat National 2. On 16 September 2006, he was named the interim manager at the senior Créteil side for 4 games after Albert Rust was sacked. He was thereafter named assistant at Créteil for 2 years under Artur Jorge and then Thierry Goudet. In April 2008, Goudet was sacked and Frapolli was named manager in the Championnat National.

In June 2009, he almost joined FC Fleury 91 but had to pull out due to family emergency. He became supervisor at Cannes for 6 months after in 2009. He became manager at Sénart-Moissy in 2010, helping them avoid relegation in the Division d'Honneur and win a regional Parisian trophy.

In June 2010, he was named Yann Lachuer's assistant at the Ligue 2 club Orléans. He was named the coach of their reserves in the 2011–12 season, and then was named coach of the senior team in the summer of 2012 when Lachuer was sacked. He helped the club win the 2013–14 Championnat National and achieve promotion to the Ligue 2 for the first time in 22 years, and was named the Coach of the Season by the managers of the league. The team was relegated from Ligue 2 the following season, finishing in 18th. He extended his contract with Orléans on 25 May 2016 for 2 years, keeping his club's confidence, on the condition that he reachieved promotion to the Ligue 2. He again achieved promotion in the 2015–16 season, coming in second place to Strasbourg. In December 2016, he was sacked after a bad start to the Ligue 2, but was recognized for his ability to scout players.

In the summer of 2017, he moved to Boulogne in the Championnat National until 2019. In May 2019, he was controversially poached by Laval and signed a 2-year contract. After a couple difficult seasons, he helped Laval win 2021–22 Championnat National and achieved promotion into the Ligue 2 once more, and was again named Manager of the Season.

Personal life
Frapolli wished to become an architect as a youth, and hoped to play football secondarily. He graduated with a Bachelor of Economics, and then received a Brevet d'État d'éducateur sportif in 1989. He has three children.

Honours
Créteil II
Championnat National 2: 2005–06

Orléans
Championnat National: 2013–14

Laval
Championnat National: 2021–22

References

External links
 
 FFF Profile
 FDB Profile
 

1971 births
Living people
Sportspeople from Hyères
French footballers
France under-21 international footballers
French football managers
Association football sweepers
Ligue 1 players
Ligue 2 players
Championnat National players
Ligue 2 managers
Toulouse FC players
Canet Roussillon FC players
Stade Poitevin FC players
AS Beauvais Oise players
US Créteil-Lusitanos players
US Créteil-Lusitanos managers
US Orléans managers
US Boulogne managers
Stade Lavallois managers

Vitrolles